Orquesta Sinfónica de Galicia is a Spanish orchestra, created in 1992 and based in A Coruña. Its conductor is Dima Slobodeniouk.

2012-13 staff
 Violins I: Massimo Spadano (CM), Ludwig Dürichen (CMA), Vladimir Prjevalski (CMA), Ruslan Asanov, Yana Antonyan, Caroline Bournaud, Gabriel Bussi, Vinka Hauser, Dominica Malec, Dorothea Nicholas, Benjamin Smith, Stefan Utanu, Florian Vlashi, Roman Wojtowicz
 Violins II: Julián Gil (P), Fumika Yamamura (P), Lucica Trita (PA), Gertraud Brilmayer, Lilia Kirilova, Marcelo González, Deborah Hamburger, Enrique Iglesias, Helle Karlsson, Gregory Klass, Adrián Linares, Stefan Marinescu, Mihai Tanasescu
 Violas: Eugenia Petrova (P), Francisco Miguens (P), Andrei Kevorkov (PA), Raymond Arteaga, Alison Dalglish, Despina Ionescu, Jeffrey Johnson, Jozef Kramar, Luigi Mazzucato, Karen Poghosyan, Wladimir Rosinskij
 Celli: David Ethève (P), Puslana Prokopenko (P), Gabriel Tanasescu (PA), Antonieta Carrasco, Berthold Hamburger, Scott Hardy, Vladimir Litvihk, Ramón Solsona, Florence Ronfort
 Double Basses: Risto Vuolanne (P), Diego Zecharies (P), Todd Williamson (PA), Mario Alexandre, Douglas Gwynn, Sergei Rechetilov, José Rodrigues

 Flutes: Claudia Walker (P), María J. Ortuño (PA), Juan Ibáñez
 Oboes: Casey Hill (P), David Villa (PA), Scott MacLeod
 Clarinets: Juan A. Ferrer (P), Iván Marín (PA), Pere Anguera
 Bassoons: Steve Harriswangler (P), Mary H. Harriswangler (PA), Manuel A. Salgueiro 

 Horns: David Bushnell (P), David Fernández (P), Miguel Á. Garza (PA), Manuel Moya, Amy Schimmelman
 Trumpets: John A. Hurn (P), Thomas Purdie (PA), Michael Halpern
 Trombones: Petur Eiriksson (P), Jon Etterbeek (P), Eymir Sommerfelt
 Tuba: Jesper Boile-Nielsen (P)

 Percussion: Simon Levey (P), José A. Trigueros (P), José Belmonte, Alejandro Sanz
 Harp: Celine Landelle (P)

World Premieres

Music directors 
 Víctor Pablo Pérez (1993 - 2013)
 Dima Slobodeniouk (2013 -)

References

External links
Orquesta Sinfónica de Galicia - OSG's web page.

Musical groups established in 1992
Spanish orchestras
A Coruña
Galician musical groups